The 2001 Houston Cougars football team, also known as the Houston Cougars, Houston, or UH represented the University of Houston in the 2001 NCAA Division I-A football season.  It was the 56th year of season play for Houston, and the only winless season in the school's history. The team was coached by Dana Dimel.  The team played its home games at Robertson Stadium, a 32,000-person capacity stadium on-campus in Houston.

Schedule

References

Houston
Houston Cougars football seasons
College football winless seasons
Houston Cougars football